2 Chronicles 25 is the twenty-fifth chapter of the Second Book of Chronicles the Old Testament in the Christian Bible or of the second part of the Books of Chronicles in the Hebrew Bible. The book is compiled from older sources by an unknown person or group, designated by modern scholars as "the Chronicler", and had the final shape established in late fifth or fourth century BCE. This chapter belongs to the section focusing on the kingdom of Judah until its destruction by the Babylonians under Nebuchadnezzar and the beginning of restoration under Cyrus the Great of Persia  (2 Chronicles 10 to 36). The focus of this chapter is the reign of Amaziah, king of Judah.

Text
This chapter was originally written in the Hebrew language and is divided into 28 verses.

Textual witnesses
Some early manuscripts containing the text of this chapter in Hebrew are of the Masoretic Text tradition, which includes the Aleppo Codex (10th century), and Codex Leningradensis (1008).

There is also a translation into Koine Greek known as the Septuagint, made in the last few centuries BCE. Extant ancient manuscripts of the Septuagint version include Codex Vaticanus (B; B; 4th century), and Codex Alexandrinus (A; A; 5th century).

Old Testament references
: 
: 
:

Amaziah, king of Judah (25:1–16)
Verses 1–4 and verse 11 in this section parallel to 2 Kings 14, along by two parts unique to the Chronicler: verses 5–10 and verses 12–16, both involving a prophetic figure. Amaziah's reign could be divided into a period of obedience to YHWH and success (verses 1–13), then a period of idolatry and defeat (verses 14–28).

Verse 1
Amaziah was twenty-five years old when he began to reign, and he reigned twenty-nine years in Jerusalem. His mother's name was Jehoaddan of Jerusalem.
Cross references: 2 Kings 14:2
"Twenty-nine years": in Thiele's chronology Amaziah became the 9th king of Judah between April and September 796 BCE then died between April and September 767 BCE at the age of 54.

Jehoash of Israel defeats Amaziah (25:17–28)
This section records the consequences of Amaziah worshipping Edomite deities (verses 15, 20: 'it was God's doing'; cf. 2 Chronicles 10:15; 22:7) in form of his defeat to Jehoash of the northern kingdom.

Verse 28
And they brought him upon horses, and buried him with his fathers in the city of Judah.
 Cross references: 2 Kings 14:20
"City of Judah": is "City of David" in 2 Kings 14:20.

See also
 
Related Bible parts: 2 Kings 14, 2 Chronicles 24, 2 Chronicles 26

Notes

References

Sources

 
 Thiele, Edwin R., The Mysterious Numbers of the Hebrew Kings, (1st ed.; New York: Macmillan, 1951; 2d ed.; Grand Rapids: Eerdmans, 1965; 3rd ed.; Grand Rapids: Zondervan/Kregel, 1983).

External links
 Jewish translations:
 Divrei Hayamim II - II Chronicles - Chapter 25 (Judaica Press) in Hebrew and English translation [with Rashi's commentary] at Chabad.org
 Christian translations:
 Online Bible at GospelHall.org (ESV, KJV, Darby, American Standard Version, Bible in Basic English)
 2 Chronicles Chapter 25. Bible Gateway

25